is a rhythm-based music video game exclusive to the Dreamcast. It was developed and published by SNK and released only in Japan on August 10, 2000.

Gameplay
The letters A, B, X, and Y appear at the edge or in the middle of a large circle on the screen. The player must use the analog stick to move a marker to the letter and press the corresponding button on the controller at the right time. If the player misses too many letters, they level down. If the performance level goes to zero, or it is too low, the game is over.

Development and release
Cool Cool Toon was developed and published by SNK. It was originally teased on March 22, 2000, when SNK posted promotional artwork on their official website and categorized the game as "Rhythm comic".

Reception

Reception of the game has been mostly positive. Reviewers praised the art style and original use of the analogue stick.

References
Translation

Citation

External links
Official page (archived)

2000 video games
Dreamcast games
Dreamcast-only games
Japan-exclusive video games
Music video games
Multiplayer and single-player video games
SNK games
Video games developed in Japan